Atara may refer to:
'Atara, Palestinian village
 , a village in Ochamchira District, Abkhazia
Atarah, Hebrew word meaning "crown" 
Atara, a former genus of gossamer-winged butterfly, nowadays included in the genus Rapala (butterfly)
Atara Barzilay, Miss Israel 1957